The 2002 Vuelta a España was the 57th edition of the Vuelta a España, one of cycling's Grand Tours. The Vuelta began in Valencia, with a team time trial on 7 September, and Stage 12 occurred on 19 September with a stage from Segovia. The race finished in Madrid on 29 September.

Stage 12
19 September 2002 — Segovia to Burgos,

Stage 13
20 September 2002 — Burgos to Santander,

Stage 14
21 September 2002 — Santander to Gijón,

Stage 15
22 September 2002 — Gijón to Alto de l'Angliru,

Stage 16
24 September 2002 — Avilés to León,

Stage 17
25 September 2002 — Benavente to Salamanca,

Stage 18
26 September 2002 — Salamanca to La Covatilla,

Stage 19
27 September 2002 — Béjar to Ávila,

Stage 20
28 September 2002 — Ávila to Warner Bros. Park,

Stage 21
29 September 2002 — Warner Bros. Park to Madrid (Santiago Bernabéu Stadium),  (ITT)

References

2002 Vuelta a España
Vuelta a España stages